Thongmyxay is a district of Sainyabuli province, Laos.

References 

Districts of Laos